Maree Cheatham (also credited as Marie Cheatham, born June 2, 1940) is an American actress, who is known for her performances on the daytime soap operas Days of Our Lives (1965–68, 1970–71, 1973, 1994, 1996, 2010), Search for Tomorrow and General Hospital, as well as for her role as Nona on the Nickelodeon comedy series Sam & Cat (2013–14). She has also worked in many feature films, including Soul Man (1986), A Night at the Roxbury (1998), Hanging Up (2000), Labor Pains (2009) and Letters to God (2010).

Life and career
Cheatham was born in Oklahoma City, Oklahoma. She graduated from Bellaire High School in Bellaire, Texas in 1958. She was an original cast member of the daytime serial Days of Our Lives, in which she played the role of Marie Horton, who was the show's very first heroine. Horton has several traumatic relationships before going into a convent to become a nun.

After leaving Days of Our Lives in 1973, she moved to New York, where in 1974 she originated the role of the sarcastic and vampy Stephanie Wilkins on the soap opera Search for Tomorrow.  She was replaced on that soap opera in early 1984 by actress and writer Louise Shaffer. In 1987, she became a regular cast member of General Hospital as Lucy Coe's wacky and fun-loving Aunt Charlene Simpson. When Gloria Monty returned as a producer in 1991, Cheatham was one of many cast members let go, but in 1998 Cheatham returned to the role with a brief appearance on the General Hospital spin-off Port Charles.

During the last two seasons of Knots Landing, she played the role of the scheming Mary Robeson, a blackmailer who became the victim in a murder mystery.

Cheatham has returned to Days of Our Lives on several occasions to reprise the role of Marie Horton, as a doctor and no longer a nun. She returned twice in 1994 and 2010 for tributes to actors that died — MacDonald Carey and Frances Reid who played Marie's father and mother, respectively. Her character also attended one of Bo and Hope's remarriages.

Cheatham played the role of Mona on the soap opera Passions in 2002.

She has also made many guest appearances in TV series such as Gunsmoke, Cagney and Lacey, Quantum Leap, The Nanny, Dharma & Greg, Profiler, Judging Amy, Scrubs, The West Wing, Monk, Cold Case and Desperate Housewives. She has also appeared in movies such as Beetlejuice, Rumor Has It..., Mr. & Mrs. Smith, America's Sweethearts, and a notable cameo in The Wedding Singer, in which she innocently asked Billy Idol what the mile high club was.

Personal life
She was once married to Bill Arvin, but it ended in divorce in 1974. In 1998, she married singer and songwriter Robert Staron (aka Bobbo Staron).

Filmography

Film

Television

References

External links

1940 births
Living people
American soap opera actresses
Actresses from Oklahoma
20th-century American actresses
21st-century American actresses